"-30-" is the series finale of the HBO original series The Wire. With a running time of 93 minutes, this tenth and final episode of the fifth season is the longest episode of the series. The episode was written by series creator/executive producer David Simon (teleplay/story) and co-executive producer Ed Burns (story). It was directed by Clark Johnson, who also directed the pilot episode and stars on the show. It aired on March 9, 2008. The episode's writers were nominated for the Primetime Emmy Award for Outstanding Writing for a Drama Series.

Plot
Tommy Carcetti and his staff learn that the "serial killer" was a hoax. McNulty and Freamon, unaware that their scheme has been exposed, discover that Gary DiPasquale has leaked courthouse documents to Levy. When Freamon gives Pearlman the identity of the mole, she reveals her knowledge of the detectives' duplicity.

Templeton calls 911, and claims there was an attempted kidnapping of an inebriated homeless man which he witnessed. When the police arrive, the man is too drunk to confirm or deny the claims, though an undercover officer at the scene confirms that Templeton made up the story. Marlo and his crew learn of Snoop's death and agree that Michael must be eliminated. Cheese posts bail and Marlo instructs him to hunt down Michael. Freamon informs McNulty that Daniels and Pearlman know about the hoax and the illegal wiretap.

Levy goes through the Stanfield arrest warrants and realizes that the police used an illegal wiretap to decipher the code beforehand. McNulty, Bunk, and Greggs arrive at the scene of another homeless murder, and are distraught that McNulty's fictitious serial killer has inspired a copycat.

Pearlman and Bond are told by Steintorf to quietly settle the Stanfield case out of court to keep the illegal wiretaps from being brought to light. Pearlman meets with Levy and uses a taped conversation given to her by Freamon to force him to settle. McNulty is confronted by Daniels and Rawls, who order him to quickly catch the copycat so that the press will assume he's the original killer.

McNulty identifies a mentally ill homeless man as the killer and the Baltimore Police Department charge him with two of the six "murders". Carcetti holds a press conference taking credit for both the "serial killer's" capture and the Stanfield arrests, then promotes Daniels to Police Commissioner. However, after Steintorf once again requests that Daniels "juke the stats" to boost Carcetti's position on crime reduction, he refuses, and is forced to resign after Campbell threatens to expose his past wrongdoings. Cheese is killed by Slim Charles for his role in Proposition Joe's murder. Michael becomes a stickup man and robs Vinson in his rim shop, where Michael shoots Vinson in the knee to force him into surrendering his drug money.

McNulty locates Larry and drives him back to Baltimore, stopping to look over the city on the way. In a closing montage: Freamon is making his miniature furniture at home; Herc is socializing at a bar with Baltimore PD members; Templeton wins a Pulitzer Prize; Slim Charles and associate meet with Spiros while the Greek listens in; Carcetti is elected governor while Campbell becomes mayor; Gus looks on as others happily work in the newsroom; Valchek replaces Daniels as Commissioner; Dukie uses the money he borrowed from Prez to feed his new drug addiction; Pearlman, now a judge, recuses herself from a case Daniels is arguing; Chris Partlow talks to Wee-Bey in the prison yard; Carcetti makes Rawls superintendent of the Maryland State Police; Bubbles eats a meal with his sister in her kitchen; Kenard is arrested. 

The montage ends with rapid cuts of various scenes from the show and people of Baltimore. McNulty gets back in his car and says to his passenger: "Let's go home". They drive off while the shot remains on the Jones Falls Expressway overlooking Baltimore.

Production

Title reference
-30- is a journalistic term that has been used to signify the end of a story.

Epigraph

This is seen in the lobby of the Baltimore Sun, as an excerpt from a longer Mencken quote displayed on the wall when Alma talks with Gus after she has been demoted to the Carroll County bureau. The full quote reads "...as I look back over a misspent life, I find myself more and more convinced that I had more fun doing news reporting than in any other enterprise. It is really the life of kings."

Music
The Blind Boys of Alabama's version of Tom Waits' "Way Down in the Hole" plays over the episode's closing montage. This version of the song had previously been used as the theme music for the show's first season.

During the scene where McNulty plays Trouble with Beadie Russell's children, the song that can be heard playing in the background is "Rich Woman" by Alison Krauss and Robert Plant from their 2007 album Raising Sand.

"Body of an American" by The Pogues is heard during McNulty's staged "detective's wake", making it the third time the song was used in the course of the show's run. Also, "The Broad Majestic Shannon" can be heard echoing out of the bar in the scene after the "wake".

Credits

Starring cast
Although credited, Michael K. Williams and Isiah Whitlock, Jr. do not appear in this episode.

Guest stars

Jim True-Frost as Roland "Prez" Pryzbylewski
Peter Gerety as Judge Daniel Phelan
Amy Ryan as Beatrice "Beadie" Russell
Paul Ben-Victor as Spiros "Vondas" Vondopoulos
Bill Raymond as The Greek
Delaney Williams as Jay Landsman
Marlyne Afflack as Nerese Campbell
Steve Earle as Walon
Ptolemy Slocum as Business Card Homeless Man
Maria Broom as Marla Daniels
David Costabile as Thomas Klebanow
Sam Freed as James Whiting
Anwan Glover as Slim Charles
Hassan Johnson as Roland "Wee-Bey" Brice
Method Man as Melvin "Cheese" Wagstaff
Dion Graham as Rupert Bond
Thomas J. McCarthy as Tim Phelps
Robert Poletick as Steven Luxenberg
Michael Willis as Andy Krawczyk
Donald Neal as Jay Spry
Kara Quick as Rebecca Corbett
Brandon Young as Mike Fletcher
William F. Zorzi as Bill Zorzi
Al Brown as Stan Valchek
Ed Norris as Ed Norris
Michael Salconi as Michael Santangelo
Brian Anthony Wilson as Vernon Holley
Megan Anderson as Jen Carcetti
Benay Berger as Amanda Reese
Eisa Davis as Rae
Tootsie Duvall as Assistant Principal Marcia Donnelly
Wendy Grantham as Shardene Innes
Bobby Brown as Bobby Brown
Dennis Hill as Detective Christeson
Doug Olear as Terrance "Fitz" Fitzhugh
Rick Otto as Kenneth Dozerman
Gregory L. Williams as Michael Crutchfield
Thuliso Dingwall as Kenard
Dave Ettlin as Dave Ettlin
Edward Green as Spider
Kwame Patterson as Monk Metcalf
Stephen Schnetzer as Robert Ruby
Carl Schoettler as Carl Schoettler
William Joseph Brookes as Lawrence Butler
Sho "Swordsman" Brown as Phil Boy
Norris Davis as Vinson
Reggie A. Green as Arabber
Joey Odoms as Corner boy
Troj. Marquis Strickland as Ricardo "Fat Face Rick" Hendrix
Connor Aikin as Jack Russell
Sophia Ayoud as Cary Russell
Gary D'Addario as Gary DiPasquale
Clinton "Shorty" Buise as Clinton "Shorty" Buise
Alan V. Poulson as Developer
Dionne Audain as Social Worker
Chris Kies as Petey the drunk
Stephen Kinigopoulos as Officer
Jeff Wincott as Johnny Weaver
Henry Carter as unknown
Edward C. Lewis as unknown
George Smith as unknown

Uncredited appearances

David Simon as Baltimore Sun staff member
Rebecca Corbett as Baltimore Sun staff member

Reception
Writers Ed Burns and David Simon were nominated for the Primetime Emmy Award in the category Outstanding Writing for a Drama Series for their work on the finale.

References

External links
"-30-" at HBO.com

The Wire (season 5) episodes
American television series finales
2008 American television episodes
Television episodes directed by Clark Johnson
Television episodes written by David Simon